Jean-Baptiste Berthelin, also known informally as Cochonfucius, is a French cognitive science researcher, a student of Jean-Claude Simon.

He is connected to the Human-Machine Communication Department of the Laboratoire d'Informatique pour la Mécanique et les Sciences de l'Ingénieur (LIMSI).

He was one of the team responsible for translating Douglas Hofstadter's book Metamagical Themas into French, the others being Jean-Luc Bonnetain and Lise Rosenbaum. The translation was published by InterEditions, in 1988, under the title Ma Thémagie.

External links 
 Berthelin's LIMSI homepage
 Berthelin's informal autobiography
 Berthelin's bibliography

French cognitive scientists
Living people
Year of birth missing (living people)